Dissolution may refer to:

Arts and entertainment

Books
 Dissolution (Forgotten Realms novel), a 2002 fantasy novel by Richard Lee Byers
 Dissolution (Sansom novel), a 2003 historical novel by C. J. Sansom

Music
 Dissolution, in music, is a specific type of section (music).
 Dissolution (Olivia Block album), 2016
 Dissolution (The Pineapple Thief album), 2018

Politics and law
 Dissolution (politics) is when a state, institution, nation, or administrative region ceases to exist, usually separating into two or more entities.
 Dissolution (law), in law, means to end a legal entity or agreement such as a marriage, adoption, or corporation, or unions.
 Dissolution of parliament, in politics, the dismissal of a legislature so that elections can be held. 
Dissolution of the Parliament of the United Kingdom
 Dissolution of the Monasteries, in British history, the formal process during the English Reformation by which Henry VIII confiscated the property of the monastic institutions in England, Wales and Ireland between 1536 and 1541
 List of monasteries dissolved by Henry VIII of England
 Dissolution of the Lesser Monasteries Act 1535
 Tudor conquest of Ireland

Science
 Dissolution (chemistry), in chemistry, the process of dissolving a solute into a solvent to make a solution

See also
 Dissolve (disambiguation)